Kirkop is a village in the Southern Region of Malta.

Kirkop may also refer to:
Oreste Kirkop (or Chircop) (1923-1998), Maltese singer
Kirkop United F.C., a football club in Kirkop

See also
 Chircop (disambiguation), a variant of Kirkop